Ronald Thomas (21 September 1915 – 28 May 1987) was an Australian cricketer. He played 26 first-class matches for Tasmania between 1933 and 1951.

See also
 List of Tasmanian representative cricketers

References

External links
 

1915 births
1987 deaths
Australian cricketers
Tasmania cricketers
Cricketers from Tasmania